Beni Israel Cemetery, also known as Cemetery Beni Israel and today known as B'nai Israel Cemetery, is an historic Jewish cemetery located at 1301 E. 2100 Road in Eudora, Douglas County, Kansas. It was founded in 1858 by German and Polish Jews who were a part of the German Immigrant Settlement Company from Chicago that had founded Eudora in 1856. One-year-old Isaac Cohn who died September 5, 1858, was the first person buried in the cemetery. He was the son of Asher Cohn (1828–1890), an immigrant businessman from Lubawa, Poland who founded a general store in Eudora ca. 1857 and who is also buried here with his wife Sarah. After 1928, burials ceased for decades until 1978 when  responsibility for the cemetery was taken on by the Lawrence Jewish Community Congregation of nearby Lawrence.

On January 2, 2013, Beni Israel Cemetery was added to the National Register of Historic Places.

See also
 National Register of Historic Places listings in Douglas County, Kansas

References

External links
 
 Lawrence Jewish Community Congregation website
 
 Beni Israel Cemetery listing on Kansas Historic Resources Inventory
 NRHP Registration Form for Cohn/Gardner-Hill & Company Store
 Eudora History: Cemeteries contains a section on Beni Israel
 

1858 establishments in Kansas Territory
Cemeteries in Kansas
Cemeteries on the National Register of Historic Places in Kansas
German-American culture in Kansas
German-Jewish culture in the United States
Polish-Jewish culture in the United States
Jewish cemeteries in Kansas
National Register of Historic Places in Douglas County, Kansas
Protected areas of Douglas County, Kansas